Robert Russell Davies (born 5 April 1946) is a British journalist and broadcaster.

Davies was born in Barmouth, North Wales. He attended Manchester Grammar School, according to his own statement on a November 2010 Brain of Britain programme. Also according to the programme, his grandfather was a mole-catcher. During his time at MGS (1957–64) he acted in dramatic society productions and was appointed school vice-captain.

He gained a scholarship to St John's College, Cambridge, and was awarded a first class degree in Modern and Mediaeval Languages in 1967, but soon abandoned his post-graduate studies in German literature when the opportunity arose to tour with the Cambridge Footlights revue. During his time in Cambridge, he contributed topical cartoons to the news pages of Varsity, the undergraduate newspaper, under the pseudonym Dai.

As a journalist, Davies worked as a film and television critic for The Observer and The Sunday Times, features writer and sports columnist for The Daily Telegraph and The Sunday Telegraph, a caricaturist for The Times Literary Supplement and was a deputy editor of Punch. He edited Kenneth Williams's diaries and letters for publication, despite being the target of Williams's acid pen in those same diaries. He regularly appeared on television in the 1980s, presenting Saturday Review for BBC2.

In 1988, Davies was the presenter of a 12-part BBC radio series Radio Fun chronicling the history of comedy on the radio from the thirties to the present day. Since 2007, the series has been repeated most years on BBC Radio 4 Extra (formerly Radio 7).

Davies is a jazz trombonist and has presented television and radio documentaries on jazz, including in 1999 a year-long history for BBC Radio 3, Jazz Century. He has written and presented other radio programmes including BBC Radio 4's series Word of Mouth (winner of the 1996 European Radio, ONDAS prize), and a series on Radio 2 about songwriters Rodgers and Hart, Legends of Light Music. In 2003, Russell Davies wrote and presented Quest for Perfection, a film about jazz clarinetist and bandleader Artie Shaw, for BBC Four and produced by John Warburton (shortlisted for the 2004 Grierson Award). By July 2005, his film had been broadcast nine times.

His documentary on the life of the cartoonist Ronald Searle was shown on the BBC in 2006.

He presents Brain of Britain on Radio 4, first temporarily to cover the illness of presenter Robert Robinson, then permanently from 2010 when Robinson retired. From 1998 (when he took over from Benny Green) until 29 September 2013, he presented a Sunday radio programme on BBC Radio 2 called 'The Russell Davies Song Show' which showcased 'The Art, Craft & Inspiration of the Popular Song'. The show was produced by Roy Oakshott and predominantly featured music from 'The Great American Songbook' and the pre-rock 'n' roll jazz era. He has also presented the BBC Radio 4 music quiz Counterpoint.

See also
 Edward Pygge, a pseudonym used by Davies

References

External links
 Brain of Britain (BBC Radio 4)

1946 births
Living people
Alumni of St John's College, Cambridge
British radio DJs
The Sunday Times people
Welsh journalists
Welsh radio presenters
BBC Radio 2 presenters